Binatlı is a village in the Batman District of Batman Province in Turkey. The village is populated by Kurds of the Reman and Sinikan tribes and had a population of 2,377 in 2021.

The hamlets of Best, Hanlı and Kolbaşı are attached to the village.

References 

Villages in Batman District
Kurdish settlements in Batman Province